Gemmula albina is a species of sea snail, a marine gastropod mollusk in the family Turridae, the turrids.

Description
The keel-rib is flattened, bearing a row of equidistant, somewhat quadrangular brown spots. The rest of the surface is very minutely and numerously punctate with brown.

The conspicuous painting on the slit-band, contrasted with the very minute sprinkling of brown dots elsewhere, is the distinguishing characteristic of this species.

Distribution
This marine species occurs off Papua New Guinea.

References

External links
 Puillandre N., Fedosov A.E., Zaharias P., Aznar-Cormano L. & Kantor Y.I. (2017). A quest for the lost types of Lophiotoma (Gastropoda: Conoidea: Turridae): integrative taxonomy in a nomenclatural mess. Zoological Journal of the Linnean Society. 181: 243-271
  Tucker, J.K. 2004 Catalog of recent and fossil turrids (Mollusca: Gastropoda). Zootaxa 682:1-1295.

albina
Gastropods described in 1822